South Korean girl group (G)I-dle have released one studio album, six extended plays, one single album and eight digital singles. They have also participated in six collaboration songs and two soundtrack contributions.

Formed by Cube Entertainment in 2018, (G)I-dle debuted on May 2, 2018, with EP I Am with the song "Latata" as their first single. The group continued with the release of their first digital single titled "Hann (Alone)" on August 14, 2018, peaking at number 8 on the Gaon Digital Chart. They released their second mini album titled I Made on February 26, 2019, followed by the release of their second digital single titled "Uh-Oh" on June 26. A month later, (G)I-dle began their venture into the Japanese music market with the release of Latata on July 31. The same year, two more singles—"Put It Straight (Nightmare Version)" and "Lion"—was released through their participation in Mnet's survival show Queendom. "Lion" managed to gain commercial success and was nominated in Korean Music Awards. In April 2020, (G)I-dle's third EP, I Trust, and its lead single "Oh My God", were released on April 6. The EP became the group's best-selling album and scored the second-highest first-day sales by a girl group with 91,311 physical copies sold. It debuted atop the Gaon Album Chart with over 110,000 copies and scored their highest debut on Billboard'''s World Albums chart. In August 2020, they released 2 albums; Dumdi Dumdi, a special summer single album on August 3 with the title track of the same name, and the group's second Japanese mini album, Oh My God, on August 26.  In January 2021, (G)I-dle's fourth EP, I Burn, and its lead single "Hwaa", were released on January 11.  In March 2022, they released their studio album I Never Die, on March 14. In October 2022 They released their EP I Love'', on October 17.

Albums

Studio albums

Single albums

Extended plays

Singles

Promotional singles

Other charted songs

Collaborations

Soundtrack appearances

Other songs

See also 
 List of songs recorded by (G)I-dle

Notes

References 

D
Discographies of South Korean artists
K-pop music group discographies